This is a list of women anthropologists.

See also 
 List of anthropologists
 
 
 

 
.
Anthropologists
Anthropologists
Anthropologists